Grantsburg is an unincorporated community in Johnson County, Illinois, United States. Grantsburg is located on Illinois Route 146 near the Shawnee National Forest, east of Vienna. Grantsburg has a post office, with the ZIP code 62943.

References

Unincorporated communities in Johnson County, Illinois
Unincorporated communities in Illinois